The Iglesia Catolica Apostolica Filipina Independiente – also known as Iglesia Filipina Independiente de Binakayan, is a Christian Church organized in Kawit, Cavite, Philippines, in 1902, under the Diocese of Cavite of the Philippine Independent Church.

Churches in Cavite
Kawit, Cavite